Lapparentosaurus is a genus of sauropod dinosaur from the Middle Jurassic. Its fossils were found in Madagascar (Isalo III Formation). The type species is L. madagascariensis.

Discovery and naming 
In 1895 Richard Lydekker named a new species of Bothriospondylus, B. madagascariensis based on fossils found before 1894 by Joseph Thomas Last in the Majunga Basin in layers of the Bathonian, the Isalo III Formation. Because there was no real connection with this English form, in 1986 José Fernando Bonaparte named a separate genus. The type species, the only known, is Lapparentosaurus madagascariensis. The generic name honours Albert-Félix de Lapparent. The holotype assigned by Bonaparte, MAA 91-92, consists of two neural arches. Much more abundant material has been referred, from at least three but perhaps as much as ten individuals from different growth stages. This includes vertebrae and limb elements but no skulls. The species is still lacking a good description and diagnosis. It should not be confused with ?Bothriospondylus madagascariensis, a distinct taxon now named Vouivria, or another distinct primitive sauropod from the Isalo III Formation once also referred to as "Bothriospondylus" madagascarensis, described as the new genus Narindasaurus in 2020. 

Age determination studies performed using growth ring counts suggest that this sauropod took 31–45 years to reach sexual maturity and was relatively fast-growing given the presence of a large amount of fibrolamellar bone.

Classification 
The phylogenetic position of Lapparentosaurus was long poorly understood. It exhibits an unusual combination of characters of both basal and derived sauropods. It has been classified as a brachiosaurid or an indeterminate titanosauriform. However, recent phylogenetic analyses have shown it to be a basal eusauropod, not closely related to brachiosaurids at all. After many decades, Emilie Läng in 2008 recovered a traditional Cetiosauridae including Lapparentosaurus. An in-depth revision in 2019 of the genus by Raveloson, Clark & Rasoamiaramana recovered a similar position with Lapparentosaurus being part of a paraphyletic Cetiosauridae, also including a multitude of similar Middle Jurassic cetiosaurids such as Chebsaurus, Ferganasaurus, and Cetiosaurus. This position is supported by the presence of two autapomorphies common on both Lapparentosaurus and Cetiosaurus: a pyramid-shaped neural spine from the anterior dorsal vertebrae with tapering in shape or not flaring distally and loss of the spinodiapophyseal lamina on the dorsal vertebrae.

Gallery
All possible remains of Lapparentosaurus:

References 

Cetiosauridae
Macronarians
Dinosaurs of Madagascar
Middle Jurassic sauropods
Sauropods of Africa
Middle Jurassic dinosaurs of Africa
Bathonian genera
Fossils of Madagascar
Fossil taxa described in 1986
Taxa named by José Bonaparte